Methinkot is a village development committee in Kabhrepalanchok District in the Bagmati Zone of central Nepal. At the time of the 1991 Nepal census it had a population of 3,909 in 724 individual households.

This VDC  has a diversified population: Brahmins, Chhetris, Tamang, Bishwokarma, Pariyar, gharti etc.

References

External links
UN map of the municipalities of Kavrepalanchowk District

Populated places in Kavrepalanchok District